The Bahmani Sultanate, or Bahmanid Empire, was a Muslim state of the Deccan Plateau in southern India between 1347 and 1527 and was one of the great medieval kingdoms. It occupied the North Deccan region to the river Krishna.

Beginning
According to an unverified founding myth, Zafar Khan had earlier been a servant or slave of a Brahmin ruler named Gangu (hence the name Hasan Gangu), who had educated Zafar in Hinduism and made him a general in his army.

The new sultanate included parts of the modern states of Karnataka, Maharashtra, and Telangana. It vied for control of the Deccan with the Hindu Vijayanagara Empire to the south. The Bahmani capital was Ahsanabad (Gulbarga) between 1347 and 1425, when it was moved to Muhammadabad (Bidar). The sultanate reached the peak of its power during the vizierate (1466–1481) of Mahmud Gawan.

References

Bahmani Sultanate